Ogus is a surname. Notable people with the surname include:

Anthony Ogus, English legal scholar
Arthur Ogus, American mathematician
Lionel Blair, born Henry Ogus (1928–2021), Canadian-born British comedian

Other uses of word
 Olorun in Yorùbá mythology
 OGUS GmbH, a German company located in Oberndorf.  See: https://www.ogus.info/